Our Boys may refer to:

Our Boys, a play by Henry James Byron, first performed in London in 1875.
Our Boys (1993 play), a play by Jonathan Guy Lewis.
Our Boys Institute, a junior branch of YMCA Adelaide, Australia.
Our Boys (magazine), a boys' magazine published monthly by the Irish Christian Brothers in Ireland between 1914 and 1990.
Our Boys (miniseries), a 2019 American-Israeli HBO television miniseries
Dundee Our Boys F.C., a former football club in Dundee, Scotland.